Robert Munro was a rugby union international who represented Scotland in the first international rugby match in 1871.

Early life
Robert Munro was born in Dull, Perthshire in 1839, the son of Alexander M. Munro, a schoolmaster, and Margaret Stewart. He was educated at the University of St Andrews.

Rugby union career
Munro played for the University of St Andrews and such was his prowess he was selected to play in the first international rugby match in 1871 between Scotland and England. This was played on 27 March 1871 at Raeburn Place, Edinburgh and won by Scotland. Later in 1871 he became licensed by the Church of Scotland of St Andrews and began missionary duties.

Career and personal life
Munro became a minister in the Church of Scotland. He was licensed in November 1871 by the St Andrews Presbytery and became a missionary at Struan in Atholl. He was ordained to St Kiarans, Govan, on 16 November 1876. He was translated to Ardnamurchan on 16 April 1879 and on 15 January 1890 translated and admitted. He was demitted on 5 December 1908. Munro died on 28 August 1913.

References

1839 births
1913 deaths
Alumni of the University of St Andrews
University of St Andrews RFC players
Scottish rugby union players
Scotland international rugby union players
Rugby union forwards
Rugby union players from Perth and Kinross